This is a list of 110 species in Microctenochira, a genus of tortoise beetles in the family Chrysomelidae.

Microctenochira species

 Microctenochira aberrata (Weise, 1904) i c g
 Microctenochira achardi (Spaeth, 1926) i c
 Microctenochira aciculata (Boheman, 1855) i c g
 Microctenochira annulata (Spaeth, 1926) i c
 Microctenochira anxia (Boheman, 1855) i c g
 Microctenochira arcana (Spaeth, 1926) i c g
 Microctenochira aspersa (Champion, 1894) i c g
 Microctenochira belizensis Borowiec, 2007 i c g
 Microctenochira bifenestrata (Boheman, 1855) i c g
 Microctenochira bilobata (Boheman, 1855) i c
 Microctenochira biolleyi (Spaeth, 1926) i c g
 Microctenochira bipellucida (Boheman, 1855) i c g
 Microctenochira bogotana (Spaeth, 1926) i c g
 Microctenochira bonvouloiri (Boheman, 1855) i c g b
 Microctenochira brasiliensis Swietojanska and Borowiec, 1999 i c g
 Microctenochira championi (Spaeth, 1926) i c g
 Microctenochira chapada Swietojanska and Borowiec, 1995 i c g
 Microctenochira chryseis (Spaeth, 1926) i c g
 Microctenochira circinaria (Erichson, 1847) i c g
 Microctenochira circumcincta (Boheman, 1855) i c g
 Microctenochira conscripta (Boheman, 1855) i c g
 Microctenochira coronata (Boheman, 1855) i c g
 Microctenochira costaricencis (Spaeth, 1909) i c g
 Microctenochira cruxflava (Champion, 1894) i c g
 Microctenochira cumulata (Boheman, 1855) i c g
 Microctenochira danielssoni Borowiec, 1995 i c g
 Microctenochira decora (Spaeth, 1926) i c g
 Microctenochira diabolica (Spaeth, 1926) i c g
 Microctenochira difficilis (Boheman, 1855) i c g
 Microctenochira diffinis (Boheman, 1855) i c g
 Microctenochira diophthalma (Champion, 1894) i c g
 Microctenochira discrepans (Spaeth, 1926) i c g
 Microctenochira discreta (Spaeth, 1926) i c g
 Microctenochira dissimilis (Boheman, 1855) i c g
 Microctenochira dissoluta (Spaeth, 1901) i c g
 Microctenochira divulsa (Boheman, 1855) i c g
 Microctenochira excelsa (Spaeth, 1926) i c g
 Microctenochira excurrens (Spaeth, 1926) i c g
 Microctenochira fairmairei (Boheman, 1855) i c g
 Microctenochira ferranti (Spaeth, 1926) i c
 Microctenochira flavonotata (Boheman, 1855) i c
 Microctenochira fraterna (Boheman, 1855) i c g
 Microctenochira freyi (Boheman, 1862) i c g
 Microctenochira gagatina (Spaeth, 1902) i c g
 Microctenochira gemina (Boheman, 1855) i c g
 Microctenochira gemonia (Spaeth, 1926) i c g
 Microctenochira gnata (Spaeth, 1926) i c g
 Microctenochira guttula (Spaeth, 1926) i c g
 Microctenochira hectica (Boheman, 1855) i c g
 Microctenochira hieroglyphica (Boheman, 1855) i c g
 Microctenochira hypocrita (Boheman, 1855) i c g
 Microctenochira impolluta (Spaeth, 1926) i c g
 Microctenochira infantula (Boheman, 1862) i c g
 Microctenochira insuperata (Spaeth, 1926) i c g
 Microctenochira jousselini (Boheman, 1855) i c g
 Microctenochira libidinosa (Spaeth, 1926) i c g
 Microctenochira lindigi (Kirsch, 1865) i c g
 Microctenochira liquidata (Spaeth, 1926) i c g
 Microctenochira lugubris (Boheman, 1862) i c g
 Microctenochira mapiriensis Borowiec, 2002 i c g
 Microctenochira marginata (Spaeth, 1909) i c g
 Microctenochira media (Boheman, 1855) i c g
 Microctenochira melanota (Boheman, 1855) i c g
 Microctenochira minax (Spaeth, 1926) i c g
 Microctenochira mucuryensis (Spaeth, 1932) i c g
 Microctenochira mystica (Boheman, 1855) i c g
 Microctenochira napaea (Boheman, 1862) i c g
 Microctenochira nigrocincta (Wagener, 1877) i c g
 Microctenochira nigroplagiata (Spaeth, 1932) i c g
 Microctenochira obscurata Swietojanska and Borowiec, 1999 i c g
 Microctenochira optata (Boheman, 1855) i c g
 Microctenochira ornaticollis (Spaeth, 1926) i c g
 Microctenochira palmata (Boheman, 1855) i c g
 Microctenochira panamensis Swietojanska and Borowiec, 1999 i c g
 Microctenochira papulosa (Boheman, 1855) i c g
 Microctenochira patruelis (Boheman, 1855) i c g
 Microctenochira peltata (Boheman, 1855) i c g
 Microctenochira plagifera (Boheman, 1855) i c g
 Microctenochira plebeja (Boheman, 1855) i c g
 Microctenochira plicata (Boheman, 1855) i c g
 Microctenochira porosa (Boheman, 1855) i c g
 Microctenochira pumicosa (Boheman, 1862) i c g
 Microctenochira punicea (Boheman, 1855) i c g
 Microctenochira quadrata (De Geer, 1775) i c g
 Microctenochira reticularis (De Geer, 1775) i c g
 Microctenochira rubrocincta (Boheman, 1855) i c
 Microctenochira sagulata (Boheman, 1862) i c g
 Microctenochira salebrata (Boheman, 1862) i c g
 Microctenochira sanguinidorsis (Spaeth, 1926) i c g
 Microctenochira scabra (Boheman, 1855) i c g
 Microctenochira scopus (Spaeth, 1926) i c g
 Microctenochira semifasciata (Boheman, 1855) i c g
 Microctenochira semilobata (Wagener, 1877) i c g
 Microctenochira semilunaris (Boheman, 1862) i c g
 Microctenochira sepulchralis (Boheman, 1855) i c g
 Microctenochira sertata (Erichson, 1847) i c g
 Microctenochira servula (Boheman, 1855) i c g
 Microctenochira severa (Boheman, 1855) i c g
 Microctenochira signaticollis (Boheman, 1855) i c g
 Microctenochira similata (Boheman, 1855) i c g
 Microctenochira soleifera (Spaeth, 1926) i c g
 Microctenochira stali (Boheman, 1862) i c g
 Microctenochira stigmatica (Boheman, 1855) i c g
 Microctenochira tabida (Boheman, 1855) i c g
 Microctenochira trepida (Boheman, 1855) i c g
 Microctenochira triplagiata (Spaeth, 1926) i c g
 Microctenochira varicornis (Spaeth, 1926) i c g
 Microctenochira villica (Boheman, 1855) i c g
 Microctenochira vivida (Boheman, 1855) i c g
 Microctenochira waterhousei (Boheman, 1855) i c g

Data sources: i = ITIS, c = Catalogue of Life, g = GBIF, b = Bugguide.net

References

Microctenochira
Articles created by Qbugbot